Jamie Clarke may refer to:

 James M. Clarke (1917–1999), U.S. House Representatives, North Carolina
 Jamie Clarke (adventurer) (born 1968), Canadian adventurer and author
 Jamie Clarke (footballer, born 1982), English footballer for Guiseley
 Jamie Clarke (footballer, born 1988), English footballer for Lincoln City
 Jamie Clarke (Gaelic footballer), for Armagh
 Jamie Clarke (snooker player) (born 1994), Welsh snooker player
 Jamie Clarke (Neighbours), a character on Australian soap opera Neighbours

See also
 Jaime Clarke (born 1971), American novelist and editor
 James Clarke (disambiguation)
 Jamie Clark (footballer) (born 1976), Scottish football player and coach
 Jamie Clark (rugby league) (born 1987), Australian-Lebanese rugby league player